Enosh Ochieng (born 1 August 1991) is a Kenyan footballer who plays for Ulinzi in the Kenyan Premier League and also the Kenyan national team.

Muhoroni Youth
Enosh was brought into Muhoroni Youth FC by the then coach Francis Baraza in 2013, he had a good first season scoring 7 goals in 15 appearances, in his second season at Muhoroni, he scored 12 goals in 22 appearances.

Ulinzi Stars Fc
Enosh joined Ulinzi in 2015 and hit the ground running scoring 5 goals in 8 matches in his first year at the club. In 2016, he played 13 matches scoring 8 goals. in 2017, he scored 8 goals in 10 matches and in 2018 he scored 17 goals in 33 matches, this feat made him win the Kenya Premier League Golden boot

International career
Enosh made his international debut in July 2019 at Dar es Salaam Stadium against Tanzania.

Personal life
He is a graduate of the Kenya Defense Forces Recruits’ Training School.

Honours
Kenyan Premier League (KPL) top scorer with 17 goals

References

External links
 http://www.ulinzistarsfc.com/tag/enosh-ochieng/
https://soka.co.ke/tag/enosh-ochieng/
http://www.fostats.com/player/12587/
https://www.youtube.com/watch?v=2d-e2XA7a6U
https://www.youtube.com/watch?v=dl0smzJ8zVs
https://www.youtube.com/channel/UCXNTJOM0V3a5ivPzHVwDmXw

1991 births
Living people
Kenyan Luo people
Kenyan footballers
Kenya international footballers
Association football forwards
Muhoroni Youth F.C. players
Ulinzi Stars F.C. players